Melvin C. Steen (1907–1992) was an American attorney and founding partner of the New York law firm Cleary Gottlieb Steen & Hamilton. Steen graduated from the University of Minnesota Law School, where the Melvin C. Steen Professorship, currently held by Gregory Shaffer, is named in his honor. His survivors included his son Gordon of Owings Mills, Maryland.

Over the years, Steen's law partnerships have included Henry Friendly and George W. Ball.

References

New York (state) lawyers
Corporate lawyers
University of Minnesota Law School alumni
1907 births
1992 deaths
People associated with Cleary Gottlieb Steen & Hamilton
20th-century American lawyers